Coombes  is a hamlet and civil parish in the Adur District of West Sussex, England.

Coombes Church is an 11th-century Church of England parish church that has lost its dedication. It has some of the most important medieval wall paintings in England, which were painted . The church is roofed with Horsham Stone slabs.

The 2001 Census recorded a population of 51 people living in 22 households of whom 23 were economically active.

See also
 Coombs (disambiguation)
 Coombe (disambiguation)

References

Further reading

External links

Adur District Council
Combes at British History Online

Civil parishes in West Sussex
Villages in West Sussex
Adur District